The India women's national cricket team toured England in August and September 2008. They played England in 5 One Day Internationals and 1 Twenty20 International. The ODI series was won by England 4–0, whilst the T20I was abandoned due to rain.

Squads

Tour matches

50-over match: Marylebone Cricket Club v India

WODI Series

1st ODI

2nd ODI

3rd ODI

4th ODI

5th ODI

Only T20I

References

External links
India Women tour of England 2008 from Cricinfo

International cricket competitions in 2008
2008 in women's cricket
Women's cricket tours of England
India women's national cricket team tours